Leiyang West railway station is a railway station in Leiyang, Hengyang, Hunan, China. It is operated by China Railway Guangzhou Group on the Wuhan–Guangzhou High-Speed Railway. It opened in 2009.

Railway stations in Hunan
Railway stations in China opened in 2009
Stations on the Wuhan–Guangzhou High-Speed Railway